The Government Internal Audit Agency (GIAA) is an executive agency of the government of the United Kingdom, sponsored by HM Treasury. It was established in April 2015, following the earlier publication of the Treasury's 2013 Financial Management Review.

The Government Internal Audit Agency is intended to help government departments to manage public money effectively by developing better governance, risk management and internal controls.  the GIAA employed around 450 people in 65 locations across the UK. Its customers include 14 government departments and over 100 associated government bodies.

References

External links 
 

Executive agencies of the United Kingdom government
2015 establishments
Auditing in the United Kingdom
HM Treasury